Dear Friend Hitler, released in India as Gandhi to Hitler, is a 2011 Indian war drama film based on letters written by Mahatma Gandhi to the leader of the Nazi Party and Chancellor of Germany and Nazi German dictator Adolf Hitler. The film, starring Raghubir Yadav as Adolf Hitler and Neha Dhupia as Eva Braun, was directed by Rakesh Ranjan Kumar and produced by Anil Kumar Sharma under the production house Amrapali media vision. It was screened at the 61st Berlin International Film Festival where it received negative reviews. Film Business Asia quoted that "despite the provocative title, the film is not a tribute to the murderous Führer". It premiered in India on 29 July 2011.

Plot
The film is set during World War II and centres upon the letters written by Gandhi (Avijit Dutt) to Adolf Hitler (Raghubir Yadav), and around the relationship of Hitler with his long-term lover Eva Braun (Neha Dhupia), whom he married in his final days in the Berlin bunker in which they died. The film depicts the difference between the ideologies of Gandhi and Hitler and claims the superiority of Gandhism over Nazism.

Cast
 Raghubir Yadav as Adolf Hitler
 Neha Dhupia as Eva Braun
 Nalin Singh as Joseph Goebbels
 Nasir Abdullah as Albert Speer
 Jatin Sarna as Shaqir
 Lucky Vakharia as Amrita Kaur
 Nikita Anand as Magda Goebbels
 Bhupesh Kumar Pandey as Subhas Chandra Bose
 Avijit Dutt as Mahatma Gandhi
 Hanuman Prasad Rai as Otto Günsche

Production
Anupam Kher had originally agreed to play the role of Hitler, but he backed out after Jewish organisations in India condemned him for playing the part because of Hitler's massacre of millions of Jews. The filmmakers accused Kher of not returning the 4 lakh (400,000 rupees) he had been paid after signing the contract and consequently sued him for 2.5 crore (25 million rupees). However, Kher perceived it as a way of filmmakers to promote their film before the release. It is the only mainstream Bollywood film to refer to the Indian Legion, a Waffen-SS unit recruited from Indian volunteers.

Criticism and controversies

British newspaper, The Guardian, declared the film to be profoundly misguided and to show a shocking ignorance of history. Noah Massil, president of the Central Organization of Indian Jews in Israel (COIJI) stated that "he would write to President Pratibha Patil and Prime Minister Manmohan Singh to intervene in order to prevent bringing disrepute to our entertainment industry", but the filmmakers claimed that the film does not glorify Hitler, but rather juxtaposes him against Gandhi's ideology of peace.

Reception
The film was met with negative reviews. The Times of India gave the film 2 stars out of 5, calling it an "unnecessary play with history". The Daily News and Analysis gave the movie one star. NDTV criticised the movie for using Indian actors to play all non-Indian characters, using India itself as a stand-in to Europe, and for its "strands". Koimoi gave the film 0.5/5; although it praised Yadav's performance as Hitler, it criticised the film's script, direction, technical values, soundtrack, and the performance from other actors.

See also
 List of artistic depictions of Mahatma Gandhi

References

External links
 
 

2011 films
Cultural depictions of Adolf Hitler
Cultural depictions of Eva Braun
Cultural depictions of Joseph Goebbels
Cultural depictions of Albert Speer
Cultural depictions of Mahatma Gandhi
Films about Mahatma Gandhi
Indian war drama films
Films set in the 1940s
Films set in Berlin
Films about the German Resistance
Films set in the British Empire
World War II films based on actual events
2011 war drama films
Azad Hind
Films scored by Sanjoy Chowdhury
2011 drama films
Films about Adolf Hitler
Film controversies
Film controversies in India